Stenoma charitarcha is a moth of the family Depressariidae. It is found in Guyana.

The wingspan is about 16 mm. The forewings are white, sometimes with a dark grey subbasal dot in the middle and with a very oblique series of four grey dots from one-fifth of the costa to the fold. There is a very irregular angulated-dentate dark grey line from a mark on the costa before the middle to beyond the middle of the dorsum, traversing the end of the cell, on which are two darker dots. Sometimes, there is a grey spot beyond the end of the cell and there are five dark grey marks on the posterior half of the costa, beneath these a triangular spot of grey suffusion at three-fourths, where a line of cloudy-grey dots, strongly curved outwards in the disc, runs to four-fifths of the dorsum. There is an interrupted dark fuscous terminal line. The hindwings are whitish, towards the apex slightly greyish tinged and with a rather dark fuscous terminal line.

References

Moths described in 1915
Taxa named by Edward Meyrick
Stenoma